First Lady of Brazil (Portuguese: Primeira-dama do Brasil) is a title given to the hostess of Alvorada Palace. The position is traditionally filled by the wife of the current President of Brazil, but may apply to women who are not the president's wives, for instance, when the president is single or widowed. They do not have official functions within the government, but usually attend public ceremonies and organize social actions such as charity events. In addition, a charismatic first lady can help convey a positive image of her spouses to the population.

The role of the first lady has changed considerably. It has come to include involvement in political campaigns, social causes, and representation of the president on official and ceremonial occasions. In addition, over the years, first ladies have exerted influence in various sectors, from fashion to public opinion on politics.

To date, there have been thirty-seven first ladies, counting twice the wives of Getúlio Vargas and Ranieri Mazzilli, who served two non-consecutive terms each. President Hermes da Fonseca had two first ladies, as he became a widower and remarried while still in office. Presidents Rodrigues Alves and Castelo Branco were widowers, hence their daughters played such a role. Brazil has never had a first gentleman, as every male president has been heterosexual and Dilma Rousseff, the first and only female president to date, had been divorced prior to taking office.

Following the inauguration of Lula on 1 January 2023, his wife Rosângela Lula da Silva became the thirty-seventh Brazilian first lady, succeeding Michelle Bolsonaro, wife of former president Jair Bolsonaro.

Wives who did not become first ladies 

 Alice Prestes, Julio Prestes's wife, did not officially become First Lady, as her husband was prevented from taking office, but he must be a former president under the Law.
 Mariquita Aleixo, Pedro Aleixo's wife, did not officially become First Lady, as her husband was prevented from taking office, but he must be a former president under the Law.
 Risoleta Neves, wife of Tancredo Neves, did not officially become First Lady, as her husband died before taking office, but he must be a former president under the law.

Social works 

The first ladies occupy a highly visible position in Brazilian society, playing an evolutionary role over the centuries.

Assistance in the country under the command of the Brazilian first lady began in the 1940s, ahead of Darcy Vargas, with the creation of the Brazilian Legion of Assistance. Founded on 28 August 1942 to assist the families of soldiers who participated in World War II, but soon became comprehensive, with emphasis on mothers and families living in poverty. With an entirely feminine style, the LBA was governed in each state by the wives of the governors and, consequently, by the wives of the mayors. From then on, all the first ladies of the country assumed the presidency of honor of the Brazilian Legion of Assistance. But it was under Rosane Collor's management that the LBA plunged into scandals over embezzlement for the first lady's family, which resulted in her leaving the organ in 1991. The Brazilian Legion of Assistance was extinguished on 1 January 1995, under the government of Fernando Henrique Cardoso.

Sarah Kubitschek innovated with the Foundation of Social Pioneers. The organization was created when it was still first lady of Minas Gerais, offering support to children, mothers and pregnant women, extending to the poorest families. The Foundation gained independence when her husband assumed the Presidency of the Republic, acquiring larger resources, originating from the Federal Government and some sectors such as: commerce, industry and individuals.

Ruth Cardoso assumed the presidency of the Solidarity Community Program, created in 1995 by the government to combat extreme poverty. The program replaced the extinct bodies of the Brazilian Legion of Assistance and the National Food Security Council. In 2000, she created the non-governmental organization Comunitas, in which she acted until her death, having been the forerunner of one of the largest social programs in the country's history, Bolsa Família. Ruth was still noted for her intellectuality, having been the first wife of a president to earn a university degree.

Shortly after becoming first lady of Brazil, it was announced that Marcela would be the ambassador for the "Happy Child" program, and was officially launched on 5 October 2016 with the Happy Child Program, with Marcela Temer as ambassador. Created by the Federal Government for the care of children from 0 to 3 years of age, with the purpose of accompanying visits to families linked to the Bolsa Familia Program, encouraging early childhood development in education, social assistance, health, human rights and culture.

Michelle Bolsonaro is committed to advocating for visibility of rare diseases, digital inclusion, awareness of autism, inclusion of LIBRAS (Brazilian Sign Language) in schools and other social projects.

First ladies' style 

Among the first thirty-seven first ladies, some draw attention for style and elegance. Sarah Kubitschek is considered to this day one of the most elegant, favoring national stylists when the country was rising in the fashion market. Classic in style, elegant and discreet, Sarah used to wear various designers, including Zuzu Angel, Dener Pamplona, Guilherme Guimarães and Mena Fiala, responsible for almost all of Sarah's wardrobe.

Considered by People Magazine the most beautiful first lady in the country and one of the 10 most beautiful first ladies in the world, Maria Thereza Goulart became an icon of Brazilian fashion in the early 60s, and used to wear clothes designed by the then nascent Brazilian haute couture. She became a client of the designer Dener Pamplona de Abreu, who was ultimately responsible for her wardrobe. Her glamorous style drew the interest of Brazilian newspapers and became a trend amongst Brazilian women, who were inspired by her clothing. Maria Thereza was the youngest first lady in the country's history, at the age of twenty-one at the time of her inauguration, having been considered by Time magazine as one of the nine Reigning Beauties in the world. She was considered an icon of Brazilian fashion in the early 60s, with the rise of haute couture in the country, attracting national and international attention, printing several covers of Brazilian magazines such as Manchete, Fatos & Fotos and O Cruzeiro; and world famous such as the French Paris Match and the German Stern.

Becoming first lady, Marcela Temer also drew national attention and became a fashion reference. At the parade on 7 September 2016, she appeared in a simple white dress with a discreet neckline. In less than 24 hours, the dress was already sold out at the online store of Brazilian designer Luisa Farani. With a classic and romantic style, the same dress she wore in her first official act as first lady, repeated in her last official act as first lady, being highly praised and associated with the British Catherine, Duchess of Cambridge.

Michelle Bolsonaro has a classic, simple and elegant style. On the day that her husband took office, Michelle was using a model considered simple, but that took 20 days to be made. The medium-length, shoulder-to-shoulder rosé model - inspired by the dresses of former United States First Lady Jacqueline Kennedy and Monaco Princess Grace Kelly generated positive comments. In her everyday life, she usually sports a casual look, mostly wearing jeans, knit shirts and comfortable wearing. She seems to take a like on classic, discreet, neckless pieces, usually wearing black, a fact that made her choose a dress in the same color with round sleeves for the cocktail party at Itamaraty on the night that her husband became president of Brazil. Her stylist is the Paulistana Marie Lafayette, who dresses the first lady at all official events. At an event held by the Planalto Palace in April 2019, Michelle wore a tube and pearl necklace, drawing comparisons to Diana, Princess of Wales.

List of first ladies of Brazil

Other spouses of Brazilian Presidents 

Two presidents were widowed before their presidencies:

 Rodrigues Alves was married to Ana Guilhermina Alves from 1875 until her death in 1891.
 Humberto Castello Branco was married to Argentina Castello Branco from 1922 until her death in 1963.

Three presidents were widowed and remarried before their presidencies:

 Epitácio Pessoa was married to Francisca Pessoa from 1894 until her death in 1895. He was later married to Mary Pessoa from 1898 until 1942.
 Carlos Luz was married to Maria José da Luz from 1920 until her death in 1924. He was later married to Graciema da Luz from 1927 until 1961.
 Luiz Inácio Lula da Silva was married to Maria de Lurdes da Silva from 1969 until her death in 1971. He was later married to Marisa Letícia from 1974 until her death in 2017.

Five presidents were divorced before their presidencies:

 Fernando Collor was married to Lilibeth Monteiro de Carvalho from 1975 to 1981.
 Itamar Franco was married to Ana Elisa Surerus from 1968 to 1978.
 Dilma Rousseff was married to Claudio Linhares from 1967 to 1969 and to Carlos Araújo from 1969 to 2000.
 Michel Temer was married to Maria Célia de Toledo from 1969 to 1987.
 Jair Bolsonaro was married to Rogéria Nantes Braga and Ana Cristina Valle.

Two presidents remarried after their presidencies:

 Fernando Collor has been married to Caroline Medeiros since 2006.
 Fernando Henrique Cardoso has been married to Patrícia Kundrát since 2014.

Wives of the military of the provisional governing boards 

 Josefa Tasso Fragoso, wife of Augusto Tasso Fragoso, general of the Brazilian Military Junta of 1930.
 Leonor de Noronha, wife of Isaías de Noronha, admiral of the Brazilian Military Junta of 1930.
 Ernestina Menna Barreto, wife of João de Deus Menna Barreto, general of the Brazilian Military Junta of 1930.
 Isolina of Lyra Tavares, wife of Aurélio de Lyra Tavares, general of the Brazilian Military Junta of 1969.
 Ruth Rademaker, wife of Augusto Rademaker, Admiral of the Brazilian Military Junta of 1969.
 Zilda de Souza Mello, wife of Márcio de Souza Mello, Brigadier of the Brazilian Military Junta of 1969.

 
Spouses of Presidents
Brazil
Spouses of the President